Pedro Delgado Campaña is the former Governor of the Central Bank of Ecuador, and cousin of the Ecuadorian expresident Rafael Correa.

He was the Governor of the Central Bank of Ecuador from November 2011, until he resigned in 2012 after accepting that he had lied about having a degree in economics.

In 2015, he was sentenced to eight years in prison for the embezzlement of public funds, resulting from an illicit loan for $800,000 to the Argentinian Gaston Duzac in 2011. This happened during Correa's regime.

References

Living people
General managers of Central Bank of Ecuador
Ecuadorian bankers
People named in the Panama Papers
Year of birth missing (living people)